The 1929 Tour de France was the 23rd edition of the Tour de France, taking place from 30 June to 28 July.

Nicolas Frantz had won two consecutive Tours, in 1927 and 1928, and was looking for a third. In addition the 1926 Tour winner, Lucien Buysse, was looking for another title.

Victor Fontan, leader of the general classification and therefore wearer of the yellow jersey, crashed in the Pyrenees during stage 10, breaking the forks to his bicycle. At that time, a rule stated that a rider must finish a stage with the bike he started it with. Fontan went house to house, looking for a bike to borrow. He eventually found one and rode 145 km to the finish line, with his broken bike strapped to his back. At the end of the day Fontan quit the race in tears. The rule was removed for the 1930 Tour de France.

The Tour was won by Belgian Maurice De Waele, although he was sick during the race. The Tour organisation was not content with the outcome of the race, because the strongest team Alycon had been able to deliver the winner even though he was sick, so they changed the rules after the 1929 Tour de France, and for the next years there were no sponsored teams but only national or regional teams.

Innovations and changes
In 1928, many stages were in the team-time-trial format, where the teams started separately. The Tour organisation had invented this rule to make the flat stages more competitive, but it had the effect that the public stopped following the race. Therefore, in 1929 the most stages were run in the normal format, except for stages 12, 19 and 20, the stages that were expected to be raced slower than 30 km/h.>

The entire podium in 1928 was occupied by members from the Alcyon cycling team. The tour organisation wanted the Tour to be an individual race, so in 1929 the teams were officially not there, and riders started in the A-category (professional cyclists) or as touriste-routiers (semi-professional or amateur).

In 1928, cyclist could be helped when they had a flat tire; in 1929 this rule was reversed, and cyclists had to fix their flat tires by themselves.

Participants

Race overview

In the first stages, the cyclists remained close to each other. Aimé Dossche won the first stage, and kept the lead for the next two stages. In the fourth stage, Maurice De Waele and Louis De Lannoy escaped from the bunch. De Lannoy won the stage, while Dewaele took over the lead in the general classification.

In the seventh stage, De Waele had two flat tires, and was not in the first group. Three man from that first group now shared the lead. There was no rule for this situation, so all three cyclists were given the yellow jersey in the next stage.
In stage eight, this situation was solved, as Gaston Rebry took over the lead.

In the ninth stage, the first mountain stage, Lucien Buysse, the winner of the 1926 Tour de France and now racing as a touriste-routier, took the lead early in the race, and mounted the Aubisque first. In the descent, De Waele and Victor Fontan caught him. De Waele then punctured and lost eight minutes. Fontan was caught by the Spaniard Salvador Cardona, but his second place in the stage gave him the lead in the general classification. In the tenth stage, after only seven kilometers Fontan broke his fork. Some sources say he hit a dog, others say he fell in a gutter. He is said to have knocked on every door of a small town before he found a replacement bicycle. According to the rules, he had to finish the race with the bicycle he started with, so he strapped the broken bicycle to his back, and rode for 145 through the Pyrenees with a broken bicycle on his back, before he finally gave up.

After that tenth stage, Maurice De Waele was leading the general classification. One hour before the start of the fifteenth stage, he collapsed. The Alcyon team asked for the stage to be started one hour later, which was granted. De Waele was literally dragged on his bicycle, and his teammates rode shoulder-to-shoulder to prevent opponents from attacking. At the end of the stage, his teammates had helped him so much that he had lost only 13 minutes to the winner, finishing in 11th place. In the sixteenth stage, De Waele became better, and only Charles Pélissier could win time on him.

After the race was over, Jef Demuysere received 25 minutes penalty time in the general classification because he had taken drinks where this was not allowed. This moved him from the second place in the general classification to the third place.

Results
In stages 12, 19 and 20, the cyclists started in teams. The cyclist who reached the finish fastest was the winner of the stage. In the other stages all cyclists started together.
The time that each cyclist required to finish the stage was recorded. For the general classification, these times were added up; the cyclist with the least accumulated time was the race leader, identified by the yellow jersey.

Stage results

General classification
During the 1929 Tour de France, the cyclists did not race in trade teams, but still the cyclists of the same team cooperated.

Other classifications
The organisers, from the newspaper l'Auto, named a meilleur grimpeur (best climber), an unofficial precursor to the modern King of the Mountains competition. This award was won by Victor Fontan.

Aftermath
After Victor Fontan had to give up in the tenth stage because of mechanical problems while he was leading the race, journalist Louis Delblat wrote that the rules should be changed, because a Tour should not be lost because of mechanical problems. Eventually the rule changed, but only after Tour director Henri Desgrange retired.

The team-time-trial format, which had been introduced to equalize power between the teams, had completely failed. It was removed for the 1930 Tour de France. Between 1935 and 1937, the concept was seen back, and returned again in 1954.

Henri Desgrange was angry at the outcome of the race. The strongest trade team decided who the winner was, while Desgrange wanted the strongest individual to win. Immediately after the 1929 Tour de France, he announced that he would drastically change the rules for the 1930 Tour de France. He removed the trade teams completely, and replaced them by national teams.

The winner of the race, Dewaele, would never reach his level of 1929 again. In 1931 he ended his Tour de France career with a fifth place.

Notes

References

Bibliography

External links

 
T
Tour de France
Tour de France by year
Tour de France
Tour de France